Aizer is a surname. Notable people with the surname include:
 Anna Aizer, American professor of economics
 Dave Aizer (born 1974), American television host, writer, and producer

References 

English-language surnames